Gerald Bernard Wilkins (born September 11, 1963) is an American former professional basketball player. He is a 6'6" (1.98 m) shooting guard/small forward, who played collegiately at Moberly Area Community College and the University of Tennessee at Chattanooga before a career in the NBA.

Wilkins is the younger brother of former Atlanta Hawks superstar Dominique Wilkins and father of guard/forward Damien Wilkins and Miss Georgia USA 2012 and Miss USA 2012 4th runner-up Jasmyn Wilkins. He was a key player on the New York Knicks team of the late 1980s, consistently being the second-leading scorer after Patrick Ewing. He was selected in the 1985 NBA Draft and was once named Player of the Week (3/3/1991). Wilkins followed in his brother's footsteps, participating in the 1986 and 1987 NBA Slam Dunk Contest, where he finished 4th and tied for 7th out of 8, respectively.

Though initially a starter on the Knicks, his role decreased with the arrival of shooting guard John Starks in 1990 and small forward Xavier McDaniel in 1992. He became a free agent after the 1992 season and signed with the Cleveland Cavaliers, which had a core of Mark Price, Larry Nance, and Brad Daugherty. The Cavaliers hoped that Wilkins would be the final piece of the puzzle in order to finally defeat Michael Jordan and the Chicago Bulls. However, the Cavaliers were swept by the Bulls in the 1993 NBA Playoffs. He remained with the Cavaliers for a few more years, but languished due to injuries, especially during 1994–95 when he was out of action the entire season.

In 1995, Wilkins was picked up by the Vancouver Grizzlies in the expansion draft, but was unable to help out the team due to injury and lack of use, playing in only 28 of 82 games. He signed as a free agent with the Orlando Magic in 1996 and became their sixth man. The Magic signed him up again for 1997–98 with a $300,000 contract. In 1999, he signed a three-year contract worth $7 million. It was in his final season with the Magic that Gerald got to play with his older brother Dominique Wilkins, although both were in the twilight of their careers and thus used sparingly.

References

External links
 Father-son comparison - Gerald vs. Damien Wilkins Stats

1963 births
Living people
21st-century African-American people
African-American basketball players
American expatriate basketball people in Canada
American men's basketball players
Basketball players from Atlanta
Chattanooga Mocs men's basketball players
Cleveland Cavaliers players
Moberly Greyhounds men's basketball players
New York Knicks draft picks
New York Knicks players
Orlando Magic players
Shooting guards
Small forwards
Vancouver Grizzlies expansion draft picks
Vancouver Grizzlies players
20th-century African-American sportspeople